Metalanguage Records was a record label in Berkeley, California, founded in 1978 by Henry Kaiser and Larry Ochs.  It showcased Rova as well as many independent artists and produced the Rova Arts Festival in 1980.

Discography
ML 101 Rova Saxophone Quartet – Cinema Rovaté (LP)	1978
ML 102	Henry Kaiser / Andrea Centazzo / Toshinori Kondo – Protocol (LP)	1979
ML 104	Evan Parker / Greg Goodman – Abracadabra (LP, Album)	1978
ML 105	Rova Saxophone Quartet / Henry Kaiser – Daredevils (LP)	1979
ML 106	Rova Saxophone Quartet – The Removal Of Secrecy (LP)	1979
ML 107	Fred Frith / Henry Kaiser – With Friends Like These (LP)	1979
ML 108	Jim French With Diamanda Galás and Henry Kaiser – If Looks Could Kill (LP)	1979
ML 109	Henry Kaiser – Aloha (2xLP)	1981
ML 110	Evan Parker – At The Finger Palace (LP, Album)	1980
ML 111	Henry Kaiser – Outside Pleasure (LP)	1980
ML 113	Greg Goodman, Henry Kaiser, Jon Rose – The Construction Of Ruins – The Australian Site (LP)	1982
ML 114	Derek Bailey, Christine Jeffrey – Views From Six Windows (LP, Album)	1981
ML 116	Bruce Ackley, Greg Goodman, Henry Kaiser, Toshinori Kondo, Larry Ochs, Evan Parker, Jon Raskin, Andrew Voigt – Metalanguage Festival Of Improvised Music 1980 – Volume 1: The Social Set (LP)	1981
ML 117	Derek Bailey, Evan Parker, Henry Kaiser, Larry Ochs, Jon Raskin, Greg Goodman, Toshinori Kondo, Andrew Voigt – Metalanguage Festival Of Improvised Music 1980 – Volume 2: The Science Set (LP)	1981
ML 118	Rova – As Was (LP, Album)	1981
ML 119	Diamanda Galas – Diamanda Galas (LP)	1984
ML 122	Ustad Ali Akbar Khan – Halfmoon (LP)	1982
ML 123	Fred Frith and Henry Kaiser – Who Needs Enemies? (LP)	1983
ML 124	Henry Kaiser

References
With Friends Like These, Fred Frith / Henry Kaiser 1979 ML 107, 1979, LP insert

Jazz record labels
American record labels
Companies based in Berkeley, California
Music of the San Francisco Bay Area
1978 establishments in California